Steve Jobs is an Italian clothing company based in Naples, Italy and founded in 2012. It was created by Vincenzo Barbato and Giacomo Barbato, who discovered the name was never trademarked by Apple. The company plans on releasing electronics in the future.

Legal issues 
Steve Jobs was sued by Apple Inc. in 2014 over its logo. The logo is shaped like a "J" with a bite taken out and an iconic apple leaf. The European Union Intellectual Property Office ruled in favor of the Barbatos.

References 

Clothing companies of Italy
Companies based in Naples
Clothing companies established in 2012
2012 establishments in Italy